Çeşnigir Bridge is a medieval bridge across the Kızılırmak River between the towns of Karakeçili and Köprüköy in Kırıkkale province, Turkey. It was built during the period of the Seljuk Sultanate of Rum.

History
There is no precise record of when the bridge was built, but it has been dated to the 13th century based on architectural and historical sources. Tradition says that the army of Timur passed over the bridge on their way to the Battle of Ankara in 1402. The architect Mimar Sinan supervised reconstruction of the bridge as part of preparations for the Egyptian Expedition of Yavuz Sultan Selim. There were further repairs during the 20th century.

The bridge was open to vehicle traffic until 1989, when it was closed due to the rise in water level after the construction of the Kapulukaya Dam. Although the bridge is now only open to pedestrians, restoration work in 2010 was carried out by the 4th Region Highways Directorate.

Construction
It has a total of 12 arches, nine primary ones and three others to reduce the weight of the abutments. The bridge is a noted example of Seljuk architecture.

References

Sources

Bridges completed in the 13th century
Deck arch bridges
Seljuk bridges in Turkey
Buildings and structures in Kırıkkale Province
Stone bridges in Turkey
Tourist attractions in Kırıkkale Province
Buildings and structures completed in the 13th century
Arch bridges in Turkey
Bridges over the Kızılırmak